The middle cervical ganglion is the smallest of the three cervical ganglia, and is occasionally absent. It is placed opposite the sixth cervical vertebra, usually in front of, or close to, the inferior thyroid artery. It sends gray rami communicantes to the fifth and sixth cervical nerves, and gives off the middle cardiac nerve.

It is probably formed by the coalescence of two ganglia corresponding to the fifth and sixth cervical nerves.

Branches
 Gray Rami Communicantes to the anterior rami of the fifth and sixth cervical nerves.
 Thyroid Branches which pass along the inferior thyroid artery to the thyroid gland.
 The middle cardiac branch, which descends in the neck and ends in the cardiac plexus in the thorax

See also
 Middle cardiac nerve

External links
 
  - "The Sympathetic Trunk and Cervical Ganglia"
 Clinical Anatomy by Richard S. Snell seventh edition page 744

Autonomic ganglia